Sarkar is a 2018 Indian Tamil-language political action film written and directed by A. R. Murugadoss, and produced by Kalanithi Maran of Sun Pictures. The dialogues were co-written by Murugadoss and B. Jeyamohan. The film stars Vijay, Keerthy Suresh and Varalaxmi Sarathkumar while Yogi Babu, Radha Ravi, and Pala. Karuppiah play supporting roles. It follows Sundar Ramaswamy, an NRI who arrives in India from US to cast his vote in the election, only to find that his vote has already been recorded as cast. Sundar raises awareness against electoral fraud among the masses and decides to contest as a non-partisan politician in the elections amidst several attempts made on his life and reputation.

Principal photography for Sarkar began in January 2018. Murugadoss collaborated with Vijay for a third time with Sarkar, which was the latter's 62nd film and given the tentative title of Thalapathy 62. In early December 2017, Sun Pictures agreed to produce the film. While Girish Gangadharan handled the cinematography, A. Sreekar Prasad served as the editor. In August, a few scenes were shot at Las Vegas. Filming was completed by September 2018. The film's soundtrack was composed by A. R. Rahman with lyrics written by Vivek.

After various complications, including protests and allegations of plagiarism, Sarkar was released on 6 November 2018, during the week of Diwali. It received mixed to positive reviews from critics and audience. Post-release, the film involved in controversies with  reference to J. Jayalalithaa in the audio track and other sequences from the film led to protests by members of the All India Anna Dravida Munnetra Kazhagam. After lawsuits were registered against the makers, the said allusions were muted. Sarkar has grossed   worldwide in its entire run, and emerged as a commercial success.

Sarkar became Vijay's third film to collect $1 million at the US box office, following Theri and Mersal. As a result of the film's success, the Election Commission of India created awareness regarding Section 49P of the Conduct of Elections Rules, 1961 that allows a voter to have the right to get back his/her ballot back and vote if someone else voted in that individual's name. Sarkar was screened at Grand Rex, France. It was also screened in Japan.

Plot 

Sundar Ramaswamy is a highly successful NRI businessman based in US, referred to as a corporate monster due to his ruthless business dealings. He arrives in Chennai to cast his vote in the Tamil Nadu Legislative Assembly election. However, he finds that someone else had already voted in his place. Sundar approaches the Tamil Nadu State Election Commission and demands a stay on the election result for his constituency, an annulment of the fraud elector's vote, and the ability to legitimately cast his vote, to which they agree. He raises awareness among the public regarding fraud voting and finds that many people too faced a similar problem to his when trying to vote. M. Masilamani, the previous C.M of Tamil Nadu, is re-elected, his daughter Komalavalli, and fellow politician and brother Malarvannan "Rendu" celebrate.

Sundar visits his family, whilst rekindling with Nila, who is his brother's estranged sister-in-law. Meanwhile, Masilamani receives suitcases full of black money, as he discovers a journalist, Muthukumar, hiding inside the suitcase, to record evidence of his corruption, and Masilamani kills him and buries the case. Sundar's actions bring him into conflict Masilamani and Rendu. Although Masilamani's party wins the elections, the Election Commission annuls the result based on Sundar's plea to recount the votes, and fresh elections are scheduled to take place within the next 15 days. After many assassination attempts on him by Rendu's henchmen, Sundar decides to contest the election against Masilamani as an Independent candidate and resigns from his company to avoid any conflict-of-interest. Initially unpopular among the masses due to his corporate background, Sundar delivers a speech detailing his rise from a humble fisherman background to a businessman and his struggle from poverty to riches, gaining massive support.

Sundar and his supporters gatecrash an event involving the merger of Masilamani's party with the opposition. After Sundar confronts Masilamani regarding his silence on district-related issues, the police brutally beats up Sundar and his supporters. At this juncture, he realises that the entire political system in the state and country needs reform, so he decides to contest in all constituencies in Tamil Nadu along with his supporters. Sundar acquires video evidence wherein people who had attempted to expose Masilamani's corruption were killed under mysterious circumstances, and he plans to reveal it to the media to discredit Masilamani and have him arrested. Meanwhile, Masilamani's daughter Komalavalli, based in Canada, arrives in Chennai after finding out that her father and uncle have lost support due to Sundar. She decides to spoil Sundar's reputation and frame him as a corrupt and power-hungry person.

Komalavalli orchestrates a car accident, planting a case of money, which is stolen by a mysterious person, blaming Sundar for the accident, which causes him to lose considerable public support. She furthers her agenda by killing her father with an overdose of diabetic tablets so that her party will gain sympathy votes. These crimes ensure that Komalavalli, the new Chief Ministerial candidate for her party, would likely win the election. On Election Day, Twitter messages generated from Muthukumar allege that Sundar has stashed black money in various locations, which further degrades Sundar's reputation. However, unknown to anyone, the tweets were sent by Sundar himself, as Muthukumar was one of those activists killed by Masilamani. Further messages lead to Muthukumar's decomposed body being found, exposing Komalavalli's lies.

Meanwhile, Komalavalli finds out that her mother has decided to expose her role in Masilamani's death at the latter's memorial in front of the media later in the day. She arrives at the memorial with her henchmen to stop the expose, but Sundar subdues her henchmen, and her mother's confession is live-streamed, which ensures that the public support is back with Sundar. Sundar and his supporters win the election, while Komalavalli and Rendu are arrested for their various crimes. However, Sundar decides against becoming the Chief Minister, and instead chooses one of his supporters, an honest collector, to be the next Chief Minister.

Cast 

Real-life activists such as Kalki Subramaniam, Piyush Manush and Fatima Babu made cameo appearances as themselves in the song "Oru Viral Puratchi".

Production

Development
Following the successful ventures, Thuppakki and Kaththi, AR Murugadoss was confirmed to be the director of the 62nd film of actor Vijay. The project, tentatively titled Thalapathy 62 (the working title as it is the 62nd film starring Vijay, who is known as Thalapathy among fans), was slated to enter production once Vijay completed Mersal and Murugadoss completed Spyder. In early-December 2017, T. Santhanam was confirmed as the art director of the film, and following this, it was made official that Sun Pictures was producing the film. Girish Gangadharan was chosen in as the cinematographer. A. Sreekar Prasad, who had previously edited Thuppakki and Kaththi, was the film's editor. B. Jeyamohan was recruited as writer, and shooting began in January 2018. The title Sarkar was revealed on 21 June 2018, ahead of Vijay's birthday.

Casting 
In mid-November 2017, it was reported that actor Yogi Babu was in talks to play a role in the film, and actress Nayanthara was in talks to be the female lead. Jaswanth Khanna, son of comedian Ramesh Khanna, who had worked as an assistant director, made his acting debut with this film. Keerthy Suresh was later signed to play the female lead role, marking her second collaboration with Vijay after Bairavaa (2017). Varalaxmi Sarathkumar was also confirmed, playing a pivotal role.

Filming
Principal photography began in January 2018. The team had successfully completed the first and second schedules of the shoot, and they began their third schedule in Las Vegas in early August. Shooting wrapped in early September.

Music 

The music and score of the film are composed by A. R. Rahman with lyricist Vivek penning the songs. The full audio album was launched on 2 October 2018 at Sai Leo Muthu Auditorium, Sri Sai Ram Engineering College, Chennai. The album consists of five songs, all penned by lyricist Vivek. The team launched the very first single, "Simtaangaran", which received mixed reviews, on 24 September, followed by "Oru Viral Puratchi" on the last day of the same month of September, which too received positive reviews. The album in its entirety was made available for download in digital on 2 October. The promotional music event featured dance performances for the songs in the background. The soundtrack album was released and bagged under the Sony Music record label. After a few days, the single track was released.

Sarkar is Rahman's fourth collaboration with actor Vijay, after Udhaya, Azhagiya Tamil Magan, and Mersal. The audio release event of the film was conducted in a much peculiar way, where for the very first time, the audience were given the privilege of launching the music album online by the means of the production company's website. The audio launch event held a live telecast aired on Sun TV, and on their exclusive paid service called SunNXT. Indiaglitz gave a 4 out of 5 star rating but cited: "Sarkar though rich in techno and electronic treatment, finds a winning combo with its amazing lyrics". Studioflicks mentioned "A mix of local and western flavour from A. R. Rahman", giving it a rating of 3.25 out of 5. Behindwoods gave it 2.75 out of 5 stars and stated: "A. R. Rahman goes full-on techno for Sarkar ".

Marketing and Release 
The film's teaser was released on October 19, 2018 and gained one million views within one hour of its release and "broken several records and turned out to be the fastest promo video to touch the one million mark".

Sarkar was released on 6 November 2018, during the week of Diwali. The film released in an unprecedented way for a Tamil film by releasing on a Tuesday. The film opened in 3,400 screens worldwide. Additionally, the film released to the Tamil speaking Indian Diaspora in 80 countries with 1,200 international screens. The film's overseas distributors have ensured that the film releases in as many as new markets such as Poland, Mexico, Philippines, New Zealand, Ukraine, Russia, and several countries in the African continent. The Kerala fans of the actor erected a 175 feet tall cut-out of the actor, the tallest cut-out for a film actor in Kollam. After its theatrical premiere, the film was made available for streaming on Sun NXT and Netflix.

Box office 
The film released on Diwali, and according to the trade trackers, it earned across Rupees 30 crore in Tamil Nadu on its opening day, beating Baahubali 2. Sarkar has broken several collection records, including the one held by Sanju for overall collections and joined the 100 Crore Club within two days. Sarkar earnings in France was more than 20,000 admissions as of 15 November 2018. In Malaysia, the film earned  from the six-day opening weekend. The film grossed 2.37 crores in Chennai on the first day and 2.32 crores on the second day. The film grossed 243-253 crores in the total run at the box office.

Reception 
The film received mixed to positive reviews from critics with praise for Vijay's performance, story, cinematography, action sequences, background score, soundtrack and social message but criticized the screenplay.

Anusha Iyengar of Times Now gave the film a 3.5 out of 5 rating and said, "Vijay's performance is far better and mature than any of his other performances. Jeyamohan, the writer of the film, deserves all the credit here for writing dialogues that only Vijay can pull off with that kind of impact and power". Sakshi Post gave the film a 3.5 out of 5 rating saying, " Sarkar has all the makings of a commercial thriller. You will see Vijay's signature dialogues which are whistle worthy and scenes with Murugadoss trademark. The film contains all the ingredients of a masala entertainer and keeps you engaged through the movie. Vijay's role is powerful and leaves a mark, BGMs provide the perfect accompaniment while action scenes stand out. Keerthy and Varalaxmi deliver". The Times of India gave the movie a 3 out of 5 rating cited that Vijay carried the film in a smart, lengthy film that has a good message but lacks strong antagonists. News18 was more critical of film and gave it a 1.5 out of 5 rating and said that the "Vijay's Film is the Glorification of a Politically Aspiring Actor. " While Sarkar cannot be faulted in direction or mounting with some great action sequences, the plot has been written only for Vijay. There is really no place for a second character. Even Keerthi Suresh, who was excellent as the South Indian actress Savithri in the biopic, Mahanati, is reduced to essaying a wide-eyed admirer of Ramaswamy. Others like Radha Ravi have also been relegated to the background.". Ananda Vikatan rated the film 40 out of 100.

Political controversies 
Following release, the Government of Tamil Nadu accused the filmmakers and Vijay of inciting the people by targeting the ruling government in some scenes and defaming former chief minister J. Jayalalithaa by naming the main antagonist with her alleged original name Komalavalli. This led to numerous protests by AIADMK party cadre at theatres, where the film was screened, and vandalism of the banners of Vijay. AIADMK accused Sun Pictures, which is owned by Kalanithi Maran, who is the grand nephew of former Chief Minister Late Karunanidhi of DMK of targeting the government.

Several actors such as Rajinikanth and Kamal Haasan supported the filmmakers by raising the voice against the oppression of freedom of speech. They cited that a film must not be scrutinised even after the censor of the film by the Censor Board. Following the threat of lawsuits from the government, the filmmakers accepted to cut the scenes and mute references of Komalavalli in the audio track.

Plagiarism allegations 
In October 2018, writer Varun Rajendran accused Murugadoss of plagiarising Sengol, a story that he had registered with the South Indian Film Writers Association in 2007. After K. Bhagyaraj, the head of the Association, concluded that Sarkars script was not original, the matter was taken to court, where the judge directed both the parties to come up with an agreement for the scheduled release of the film. In the resulting agreement, the director admitted that the story of Sarkar was the same as of Sengol and that Sun Pictures agreed to thank Varun Rajendran and flash a message card for 30 seconds after the thank you note in the title card and also pay him  as compensation.

Awards and nominations

Impact 
As a result of the film's success, the Election Commission of India created awareness regarding Section 49P of the Conduct of Elections Rules, 1961 that allows a voter to have the right to get back his/her ballot back and vote if someone else voted in that individual's name.

In popular culture
The Telugu film Officer was dubbed and released in Tamil as Simtangaran named after the song from the film.

Notes

References

External links 
 

2018 films
Films directed by AR Murugadoss
2010s Tamil-language films
2018 action drama films
2010s political drama films
Indian action drama films
Indian political drama films
Political action films
Films scored by A. R. Rahman
Films involved in plagiarism controversies
Films set in the Las Vegas Valley
Films set in Chennai
Films shot in Chennai
Films shot in Toronto
Films shot in Pollachi
Films shot in the Las Vegas Valley
Films about elections
Films about corruption in India
Films about social issues in India
Indian political thriller films
Indian political films
Sun Pictures films